Matthew Ahmet (born 25 December 1988) is a London-born practitioner of Shaolin Kung Fu who is best known as the coach for Shaolin Temple's "Wheel of Life" in  Superstars of Dance. Ahmet is the only non-Chinese disciple of the Shaolin Temple to perform alongside the Shaolin Wheel of life show. In 2009, Ahmet set up the Shaolin Temple Cheshunt home to the Shaolin Warriors London who performed as Team Shaolin in the fourth series of Britain's Got Talent and were eliminated in the semi-final.

Ahmet is of Turkish descent. In late 2010, it was announced that he would have a reality show that was set to be broadcast in early 2011.

Ahmet's dedication and approach to life is based on a fundamental principle that with focus and positivity anyone can make a change to their life. With this in mind, he works with people of all ages, providing spiritual guidance and motivation. He is becoming a sought after keynote speaker and recently presented the keynote speech at The Guild of Letting & Management's annual conference.

References 

1988 births
Living people
British wushu practitioners
People from Camden Town
Converts to Buddhism
English Buddhist monks
Britain's Got Talent contestants
English people of Turkish descent